The 2023 Ole Miss Rebels football team will represent the University of Mississippi in the West Division of the Southeastern Conference (SEC) during the 2023 NCAA Division I FBS football season. The Rebels are expected to be led by Lane Kiffin in his fourth season as their head coach.  

The Ole Miss football team plays its home games at Vaught–Hemingway Stadium in Oxford, Mississippi.

Schedule
Ole Miss and the SEC announced the 2023 football schedule on September 20, 2022. The 2023 Rebels' schedule consists of 7 home games and 5 away games for the regular season. Ole Miss will host four SEC conference opponents Arkansas (rivalry), LSU (Magnolia Bowl), Texas A&M and Vanderbilt (rivalry) at home and will travel to four SEC opponents, Alabama (rivalry), Auburn (rivalry), Georgia and Mississippi State (Egg Bowl) to close out the SEC regular season on the road. Ole Miss is not scheduled to play SEC East opponents Florida, Kentucky, Missouri, South Carolina and Tennessee in the 2023 regular season. The Rebel's bye week comes during week 7 (on October 14, 2023).

Ole Miss' out of conference opponents represent the American, ACC, SoCon and the Sun Belt conferences. The Rebels will host three non–conference games which are against Georgia Tech from the ACC, Louisiana–Monroe from the Sun Belt and Mercer from the SoCon (FCS) and will travel to Tulane (rivalry) from the American.

References

Ole Miss
Ole Miss Rebels football seasons
Ole Miss Rebels football